The Home Run Derby—as a proper name—is an annual home run hitting competition in Major League Baseball (MLB), usually held the day before the MLB All-Star Game.

A home run derby—as a general term—is a batting competition in baseball or softball during which the objective is to hit the most home runs.

Home Run Derby may also refer to:
 Triple-A Home Run Derby, a similar contest in Minor League Baseball
 CPBL Home Run Derby, a similar contest in the Chinese Professional Baseball League (CPBL)
 MLB Home Run Derby X, a global baseball tour operated by MLB that debuted in 2022
 Home Run Derby (TV series), a 1960 television show featuring MLB players in a home run hitting contest
 Winnie the Pooh's Home Run Derby, a 2007 baseball video game

See also
 
 Home run (disambiguation)